Jane Schumacher (born 27 August 1988 in Tinglev) is a Danish team handball player. She plays for the club OGC Nice Côte d'Azur Handball, and on the Danish national team. She represented Denmark at the 2013 World Women's Handball Championship in Serbia.

References

Danish female handball players
1988 births
Living people
Danish expatriate sportspeople in France
People from Aabenraa Municipality
Sportspeople from the Region of Southern Denmark